Risto Olavi Rasa (born 29 April 1954 in Helsinki) is a Finnish poet. He writes short nature poems. He is a librarian in Somero.

Poem books 
Metsän seinä on vain vihreä ovi ("The wall of the forest is only a green door") (1971)
Kulkurivarpunen ("The vagabond sparrow") (1973)
Hiljaa, nyt se laulaa ("Be quiet! Now it sings") (1974)
Kaksi seppää ("Two smiths") (1976)
Rantatiellä ("On the shore way") (1980)
Laulu ennen muuttomatkaa ("The song before the migratory") (poems 1971–1980 [1982])
Taivasalla ("In the open air") (1987)
Tuhat purjetta ("Thousand sails") (poems 1971–1990 [1992])

External links
 Rasa's poems in Finnish and English

1954 births
Living people
Writers from Helsinki
20th-century Finnish poets
Recipients of the Eino Leino Prize
Finnish male poets
Finnish librarians
20th-century male writers